One of Our Own (also known as The Week of Fear) is a television film which aired on NBC on May 5, 1975. It served as the pilot for the series Doctors' Hospital.

It stars George Peppard as Dr. Jake Goodwin, chief of neurosurgery at the busy Lowell Memorial Hospital.

Cast

References

External links
 

1975 drama films
1975 television films
1975 films
American drama television films
NBC network original films
Television films as pilots
Films directed by Richard C. Sarafian
1970s American films